Simon was a relay-based computer, described by Edmund Berkeley in a series of thirteen construction articles in Radio-Electronics magazine, from October 1950. Intended for the educational purpose of demonstrating the concept of digital computer, it could not be used for any significant practical computation since it had only two bits of memory. In 1950, it sold for US$600. Some have described it as the "first personal computer", although its extremely limited capacity and its unsuitability for use for any purpose other than as an educational demonstration make that classification questionable.

History 
The "Simon project" arose as a result of the Berkeley's book Giant Brains, or Machines That Think, published in November 1949. There, the author said:

 
In November 1950, Berkeley wrote an article titled Simple Simon for Scientific American magazine, that described digital computing principles to the general public. Despite Simon's extreme lack of resources (it could only represent the numbers 0, 1, 2 and 3), Berkeley stated on page 40 that the machine "possessed the two unique properties that define any true mechanical brain: it can transfer information automatically from any one of its "registers" to any other, and it can perform reasoning operations of indefinite length." Berkeley concluded his article anticipating the future:

Technical specifications 
The Simon's architecture was based on relays. The programs ran from a standard paper tape, with five rows of holes for data. The registers and ALU stored only 2 bits. The user entered data via punched paper, or by five keys on the front panel. The machine output data through five lamps.

The punched tape served not only for data entry, but also as  memory storage. The machine executed instructions in sequence, as it read them from the tape. It could perform four operations: addition, negation, greater than, and selection.

Notes

External links 
 Simon's FAQ
 Edmund Berkeley's Simon Relay Processor. Archived
 
 Edmund C. Berkeley Papers, Charles Babbage Institute, University of Minnesota.  Box 22 has correspondence, memos, accounting records, and notes on the development and marketing of small robots, including Relay Moe, Franken, Tit-Tat-Toe Machine, Test Your Nerve Machine, Simon, and mechanical brain kits.

Electro-mechanical computers
1950s computers
Computer-related introductions in 1950